Brüsewitz is a municipality in the Nordwestmecklenburg district, in Mecklenburg-Vorpommern, Germany. Besides the village of Brüsewitz, the municipality includes the villages of Gottmannsförde, Groß Brütz and Herren Steinfeld.

See also
Brusewitz (surname), for people with the surname

References

Nordwestmecklenburg